was a village located in Higashiyamanashi District, Yamanashi Prefecture, Japan.

As of 2003, the village has an estimated population of 1,495 and a density of 34.74 persons per km². The total area is 43.03 km².

History 
The village was established in 1941 by merging five villages from two different districts: Hajikano, and Tsuruse from Higashi-yamanashi; Tokusa, Tano, and Hikage from Higashi-yatsushiro.

On November 1, 2005 Yamato, along with the city of Enzan, and the town of Katsunuma (also from Higashiyamanashi District), was merged to create the city of Kōshū.

External links
 Kōshū official website 

Dissolved municipalities of Yamanashi Prefecture